Shingobee may refer to:

Shingobee Bay
Shingobee Lake, a lake in Minnesota
Shingobee River
Shingobee Township, Cass County, Minnesota